Mei Qing (ca. 1623–1697) was a Chinese landscape painter, calligrapher and poet active during the Qing Dynasty.

Mei was born in Xuancheng, Anhui Province. His style name was 'Yuangong' (渊公 or 远公) and his pseudonyms were 'Mount Qu' (Qushan 瞿山), 'Winter Hut' (Xue Lu 雪庐), and 'Lao Qu Fan Fu'. Mei was taught by Wang Meng. He was a friend Shitao, influencing some of Shitao's earlier works. His landscape paintings were based on his many travels to the Yellow Mountain.

His works on poetry include: Tian Yan Garret Collection and Mei Shi Anthology.

Notes

References
Barnhart, R. M. et al. (1997). Three thousand years of Chinese painting. New Haven, Yale University Press. 
 Ci hai bian ji wei yuan hui. Ci hai . Shanghai: Shanghai ci shu chu ban she , 1979.

1623 births
1697 deaths
Qing dynasty landscape painters
Qing dynasty poets
Qing dynasty calligraphers
Painters from Anhui
Poets from Anhui
People from Xuancheng